Piranshahr County is in West Azerbaijan province, Iran. The capital of the county is the city of Piranshahr. At the 2006 census, the county's population was 107,677 in 20,617 households. The following census in 2011 counted 123,639 people in 28,415 households. At the 2016 census, the county's population was 138,864 in 34,560 households.

Administrative divisions

The population history of Piranshahr County's administrative divisions over three consecutive censuses is shown in the following table. The latest census shows two districts, five rural districts, and two cities.

References

 

Counties of West Azerbaijan Province